Dean L. (Lake) Ray was a pilot in the US Army Air Forces.

While performing at an airshow in Nicaragua, his airplane malfunctioned.  Ray remained in his aircraft and directed it away from spectators, and died in the subsequent crash.

He was declared a national hero, and the then-president of Nicaragua attended his funeral.  His photo is featured on a Nicaraguan Stamp.

References 

United States Army Air Forces officers